The Dornier Do 24 is a 1930s German three-engine flying boat designed by the Dornier Flugzeugwerke for maritime patrol and search and rescue. A total of 279 were built among several factories from 1937 to 1945.

Design and development

The Dornier Do 24 was designed to meet a Royal Netherlands Navy requirement for a replacement of the Dornier Wals being used in the Dutch East Indies, with the Netherlands government signing a contract for six Dornier Do 24s on 3 August 1936. Two more prototypes were built for the German navy to be evaluated against the Blohm & Voss BV 138.

The Do 24 was an all-metal parasol monoplane with a broad-beamed hull and stabilising sponsons. Twin tails were mounted on the upswept rear of the hull, while three wing-mounted tractor configuration engines powered the aircraft. Fuel was carried in tanks in the sponsons and the wing centre section. In early aircraft the turrets were each fitted with a machine gun but later aircraft carried a 20 mm cannon in the dorsal turret.

Do 24 V3, the first of the Dutch X boats, as they would be called in Dutch service, took off from Lake Constance on 3 July 1937, with the second Dutch boat, Do 24 V4 following soon after. As the Dutch required that their flying boats use the same engines as the Martin 139 bombers in use in the Dutch East Indies, they were fitted with  Wright R-1820-F52 Cyclone radial engines. Test results were good, with the new flying boat proving capable of operating from extremely rough open seas and the Dutch placed an order for a further 12 Do 24s on 22 July 1937.  Do 24 V1, the first of the two aircraft for Germany, powered by three  Junkers Jumo 205C diesel engines, flew on 10 January 1938 but after evaluation, the two German boats were returned to Dornier for storage.

The Netherlands was enthusiastic and planned to purchase as many as 90. Of these, 30 were to be built by Dornier (with all but the first two prototypes assembled by Dornier's Swiss subsidiary based at Altenrhein). The remaining aircraft were to be built under licence in the Netherlands by Aviolanda at Papendrecht. Of these aircraft, all but one of the German and Swiss built aircraft and the first seven Aviolanda-built aircraft were to be Do 24K-1s, powered by the original R-1820-F52 engines, while the remaining aircraft were to be Do 24K-2s, with more powerful  R-1820-G102 engines and additional fuel.

With the German occupation, production was paused, however while the Luftwaffe Küstenfliegergruppen Maritime reconnaissance branch was uninterested in the partially completed aircraft as they had already chosen the Blohm und Voss Bv 138 for the role, the Dutch production line resumed, to provide aircraft for the otherwise poorly equipped Seenotdienst (Sea Emergency Service), which was still operating Heinkel He 59 biplanes. The 13 airframes on the Aviolanda assembly line were completed with Dutch-bought Wright Cyclone engines but later models used the BMW Bramo 323R-2. An additional 159 Do 24s were built in the Netherlands during the occupation, most under the designation Do 24T-1.

Another production line for the Do 24 was established in the CAMS factory at Sartrouville, France, during the German occupation. This line was operated by SNCAN and produced 48 Do 24s during the war and another 40 after the liberation of France, which served with the French Navy until 1952.

Operational history

Germany 
The 2 prototypes were used during the invasion of Norway to transport troops to Narvik.

The aircraft captured and produced in the Netherlands were pressed into service with Seenotstaffeln and deployed in the Arctic, Baltic, North Sea, Biscaje, Mediterranean, and Black Sea. They were also used as transports, notably for keeping contact with the troops left behind on the Aegean Islands and Crete, and for supporting the Kuban bridgehead in early 1943

Netherlands 
Thirty-seven Dutch- and German-built Do 24s had been sent to the East Indies by the time of the German occupation of the Netherlands in June 1940. Until the outbreak of war, these aircraft would have flown the tri-color roundel. Later, to avoid confusion with British or French roundels, Dutch aircraft flew a black-bordered orange triangle insignia. 

A Dutch Dornier Do 24 is credited with sinking the Japanese destroyer Shinonome on December 17, 1941 while the ship was escorting an invasion fleet to Miri in British Borneo. After the Japanese invasion of the Netherlands East Indies, six surviving Do 24s were transferred to the Royal Australian Air Force in February 1942. They served in the RAAF through most of 1944 as transports in New Guinea.

Spain 
In 1944, 12 Dutch-built Do 24s were delivered to Spain with the understanding that they would assist downed airmen of both sides. After the war, a few French-built Do 24s also found their way to Spain. Spanish Do 24s were operational at least until 1967, and possibly later. In 1971, one of the last flying Spanish Do 24s was returned to the Dornier facility on Lake Constance for permanent display.

Sweden 
On 31 October 1944, a German Do 24 (CM+RY of Seenotgruppe 81) made a forced landing in neutral Sweden, was impounded and eventually bought, and remained in Swedish service until 1952.

Variants

Do 24 V1
Luftwaffe trials aircraft powered by three  Junkers Jumo 205C liquid-cooled diesel inline engines.
Do 24 V2
Luftwaffe trials aircraft similar to V1
Do 24 V3
Dutch trials aircraft with three  Wright R-1820-F52 Cyclone air-cooled radial engines. Later became the first Do 24K-1, and was the first Do 24 to fly. Assigned serial X-1.
Do 24 V4
Second K-1 for Dutch trials, Assigned serial X-2.
Do 24K-1
Swiss production by Dornier & Dutch license production aircraft, 36 built. The German civil registration D-AYWI was allocated for these for their ferry flights to Holland from Dornier's production facility in Switzerland.
Do 24K-2
Dutch licence production powered by three  Wright R-1820-G102 Cyclone engines. 1 example completed by Dornier while 13 incomplete airframes were captured by the Germans, and modified for air-sea rescue with additional hatches and a hoist as 24N-1s.
Do 24N-1
13 incomplete Dutch Do 24K-2s being built in Holland completed for the Luftwaffe for air-sea rescue, powered by three  Wright R-1820-G102 engines. As supplies of spares for the R-1820s ran out, surviving aircraft were re-engined with  BMW 132N radials.
Do 24T-1
French production, 48 built
Do 24T-1
Dutch production for the Luftwaffe powered by three  BMW Bramo 323R-2 Fafnir radial engines, 159 built (including T-2 and T-3).
Do 24T-2
as Do 24T-1 with minor changes to equipment and weapons.
Do 24T-3
as Do 24T-1 with minor changes to equipment and weapons.
Do 24 ATT
Post-war restoration/amphibian conversion with three Pratt & Whitney Canada PT6A-45 turboprop engines, one converted.
Do 318
One Do 24T modified in 1944 with a boundary-layer control system.

Operators

 Royal Australian Air Force

 French Navy (Postwar)

 Luftwaffe

 Royal Netherlands Navy
 Netherlands Naval Aviation Service

 Royal Norwegian Air Force (Postwar)

 Polar Aviation

 Spanish Air Force

 Swedish Air Force

Surviving aircraft

Australia
 Unknown – Do 24 K-1 forward fuselage on static display at the Lake Boga Flying Boat Museum in Lake Boga, Victoria. It was previously used as a private boat in Echuca, Victoria.

France
 1101 – Do 24 T-3 forward fuselage on static display at the Musée de l'Hydraviation in Biscarrosse, Nouvelle-Aquitaine.

Germany
 5291/5345 – Do 24 T-3 on static display at the Flugwerft Schleißheim branch of the Deutsches Museum in Oberschleißheim, Bavaria. It was previously on display at the Dornier-Fairchild factory in Oberpfaffenhofen. This aircraft has the fuselage of Aviolanda-built WNr. 5291, mated with the original wing of the Do 24 that became the Do 24 ATT:
 Unknown – Do 24 T fuselage on display at the Technik Museum Speyer in Speyer, Rhineland-Palatinate.
 5345 – Do 24 ATT , an extensively modified ex-Spanish Do 24 T-3 fitted with a Dornier 228 type Advanced Technology Wing, re-engined with three PT6A-45B turboprops, and fitted with retractable undercarriage, converting it from a pure flying boat, into an amphibian. In February 2004, it began an around the world flight on behalf of UNICEF to raise money for children in the Philippines, piloted by Iren Dornier, Claudius Dornier's grandson.

Netherlands
 3387 – Do 24 T-3 on static display at the Nationaal Militair Museum in Soesterberg, Utrecht. It is painted in the livery of the Marine Luchtvaartdienst.

Spain
 2134 – Do 24 T-3 on static display at the Museo del Aire in Cuatro Vientos, Madrid.

Specifications (Do 24T-1)

See also

References

Notes

Bibliography

External links

 Do 24ATT World Tour - An Iren Dornier Project
 

Do 024
1930s German patrol aircraft
Flying boats
Diesel-engined aircraft
Trimotors
World War II patrol aircraft of Germany
Parasol-wing aircraft
Aircraft first flown in 1937